Alejandro Gómez Cabral (11 April 1967 in Vigo, Pontevedra – 31 January 2021) was a Spanish long-distance runner who specialized in the marathon and cross-country running.

Career 
He stood out from a very young age, he was a Spanish junior record holder of 5,000 m (14: 16.7), a promise of 10,000 m (27: 54.13) and a junior of 2,000 m (5: 09.5), 5,000 m (13: 42.17) and 3,000 m obstacles (8: 36.4).

He was also champion of Spain of cross country in the youth category in 1984, of 5,000 m and cross country in the promises category in 1986, 1987 and 1988 and of 3,000 m obstacles in 1987. In absolute category he was several times champion of Spain of 10,000m., Half marathon, and cross. In the international field, he participated in the Olympic Games in Seoul 1988 in the 5000 m, in Barcelona 1992 and in Atlanta 1996 in the 10,000 m event, where he was 15th in the final with a mark of 29: 38.11. At the 1991 World Athletics Championships in Tokyo he was 9th in the 10,000m final with a time of 28: 13.71.

At the 1995 World Athletics Championships held in Gothenburg he was 16th in 10,000 m and at the 1999 World Athletics Championships held in Seville he ranked 40th in marathon. The two times he was closest to a podium were in the marathons of the 1998 European Athletics Championships held in Budapest and in the 2002 European Athletics Championships held in Munich where he was 5th and 6th respectively. He participated many times in the cross-country world championship, and achieved third place in teams in 1989. In the European Championship he won silver in the second edition held in Alnwick in 1995 where he was proclaimed the European team champion. He also participated in several editions of the World Half Marathon, achieving an 8th place in Palma de Mallorca, his best performance, where he was runner-up for teams with the national team. As a member of the Spanish marathon team that stood out so much at the end of the nineties, he was runner-up in the European Cup in 1998, and was also the distance record holder, a mark that he snatched from Martín Fiz in 1997 with a second place in the Rotterdam marathon with a mark of 2:07:54.

In June 2020, an inoperable brain tumor was detected and he died on 31 January 2021.

Achievements

Personal bests
1500 metres - 3:39.18 min (1991)
3000 metres - 7:47.7 min (1989)
3000 metres steeplechase - 8:33.6 min (1989)
5000 metres - 13:20.91 min (1989)
10,000 metres - 27:39.38 min (1993)
Half marathon - 1:01:20 hrs (1992)
Marathon - 2:07:54 hrs (1997)

References

External links
 

1967 births
2021 deaths
Spanish male long-distance runners
Athletes (track and field) at the 1988 Summer Olympics
Athletes (track and field) at the 1992 Summer Olympics
Athletes (track and field) at the 1996 Summer Olympics
Olympic athletes of Spain
Deaths from brain cancer in Spain